Moon Hyungbae is a South Korean judge. He was named a Justice of the Constitutional Court of Korea in 2019.

Career 
1987  Seoul National University College of Law 
1992  Judge, Busan District Court 
2012  Presiding Judge, Busan High Court
2016  Chief Judge, Busan Family Court 
2019~ Justice of the Constitutional Court of Korea

References

External links 
Profile at the Constitutional Court of Korea

South Korean judges
1966 births
Living people
Justices of the Constitutional Court of Korea
Seoul National University School of Law alumni